Omar El Turk (in Arabic عمر الترك) (born September 30, 1981 in Beirut, Lebanon) is a retired Lebanese Canadian basketball player and member of the Lebanon national basketball team.

Immigrating to Canada, he played with Montreal, Quebec's Dawson College Blues. A  shooting guard, he signed with Sporting Al Riyadi Beirut of the Lebanese Basketball League and has competed with the team for the last five seasons, helping the team become one of the strongest Lebanese sides.

El Turk is also a long-time member of the Lebanon national basketball team. He has competed with the team at three Asian championships, helping the team to a silver medal at both the FIBA Asia Championship 2005 and FIBA Asia Championship 2007.  He also competed at the 2006 FIBA World Championship for the Lebanese, who finished with a national-best 2-3 record at the tournament.

El Turk also played in Byblos Sporting Club 

El Turk was born in Lebanon and his mother was a basketball player. He has two brothers (Ali) and (Ayman) both still living in Canada. Omar el Turk is married to Yasmin Khalil and they have one daughter (Lea) and a son (Sam).

References

1981 births
Living people
Lebanese men's basketball players
Dawson College alumni
Basketball players at the 2006 Asian Games
Shooting guards
2006 FIBA World Championship players
Asian Games competitors for Lebanon
Al Riyadi Club Beirut basketball players